Sarailan-e Sar Qaleh (also Romanized as Sarā'īlān-e Sar Qal‘eh, Sarā’īlān Sar Qal‘eh, and Sarāylān-e Sar Qal‘eh; also known as Sarāylān) is a village in Jalalvand Rural District, Firuzabad District, Kermanshah County, Kermanshah Province, Iran. At the 2006 census, its population was 126, in 22 families.

References 

Populated places in Kermanshah County